The following is a list of county routes in Somerset County in the U.S. state of New Jersey.  For more information on the county route system in New Jersey as a whole, including its history, see County routes in New Jersey.

500-series county routes
In addition to those listed below, the following 500-series county routes serve Somerset County:
CR 512, CR 514, CR 518, CR 523, CR 525, CR 527, CR 529, CR 531, CR 533, CR 533 Spur, CR 567

Other county routes

See also

References

 
Somerset